is a 2014 Japanese erotic action film directed by Kurando Mitsutake and starring Asami Sugiura. It was released in Japan on July 19, 2014. The majority of the film was filmed in English, with some scenes in Japanese.

Plot
Two assassins cross the desert to reach their evacuation point. During their journey, one recounts the tale of a man known as Mastermind. The man turned a junkie prostitute into a lethal killing machine.

Cast
Asami Sugiura as Mayumi - Gun Woman
Kairi Narita as Mastermind
Matthew Floyd Miller as Assassin (as Matthew Miller)
 Dean Simone as Driver
Noriaki Kamata as Hamazaki's Son (as Noriaki R. Kamata)
Tatsuya Nakadai as Mr. Hamazaki
Midori M. Okada as Keiko

Reception
Tom Mes of Midnight Eye included the film among the best Japanese films of the year and said it "offers thrills aplenty and features an absolutely electrifying physical performance from cult actress Asami."

At the 2014 Yubari International Fantastic Film Festival, the film won the Special Jury Prize.

References

External links
 

2014 action films
2010s erotic films
Japanese action films
Japanese erotic films
English-language Japanese films
2010s English-language films
2010s Japanese films